Amegilla subinsularis, is a species of bee belonging to the family Apidae subfamily Apinae.

References

External links
 
 academia.edu
 

Apinae
Insects of Sri Lanka
Insects described in 1910